Michael James Halvorson (born 1 March 1963) is an American technology writer and historian. He was employed at Microsoft Corporation from 1985 to 1993 and contributed to the growth of the Microsoft Office and Microsoft Visual Basic software platforms. He is the author of 40 books related to computer programming, using PC software, and the histories of Europe and the United States.

Early career 
Halvorson grew up in Olympia, Washington. He received a B.A. degree in Computer Science from Pacific Lutheran University (PLU) in 1985, and MA and Ph.D. degrees in History from the University of Washington (1996, 2001). In a recent book, he discusses the formative influence of the liberal arts on his approach to technical writing and software systems.

In November 1985, Halvorson was hired as employee #850 at Microsoft in Bellevue, Washington, where he worked as a technical editor, acquisitions editor, and localization project manager.

Halvorson was an influential acquisitions editor at Microsoft Press during the early years of personal computing, acquiring and editing books from notable American technology writers such as Ray Duncan, Dan Gookin, Steve McConnell, Jerry Pournelle, Neil Salkind, and Van Wolverton. Within Microsoft's product teams, Halvorson worked as a localization project manager for the Visual Basic for MS-DOS 1.0 compiler (1992), contributing to the release of the product in the French and German languages.

Technical writing 
Halvorson's first influential book was Learn BASIC Now, a Microsoft QuickBASIC programming primer co-authored by David Rygmyr. The book was published by Microsoft Press in 1989 and included a foreword by Bill Gates, who described Microsoft's plans for the BASIC language in future operating systems and application software. Learn BASIC Now won the Computer Press runner-up prize for "Best How-To Book" published in 1989. In a review of the book, L. R. Shannon of the New York Times wrote, “For anyone who wants to learn something about programming, it would be hard to find an easier or more cost-effective source than Learn BASIC Now.” In 1990, a Macintosh version of the book was published which included the Microsoft QuickBASIC Interpreter for Macintosh Plus, SE, and II systems on 3.5” diskettes.

Halvorson later wrote a series of popular books on the emerging Microsoft Office software suite, including Running Microsoft Office for Windows 95, co-authored with Michael Young. In May 1999, Halvorson's Running Microsoft Office 2000 attempted to calm fears about the pending Y2K problem (or Millennium bug), which the authors believed was driven by popular hysteria. A series of textbooks introducing Microsoft Works and Microsoft Office followed to help popularize Microsoft's integrated software suites and the idea that learning to use them efficiently was a suitable subject for college students.

In later years, Halvorson's Microsoft Visual Basic Step by Step programming series was popular among new-to-topic developers who sought to learn Visual Basic for Windows and the Microsoft Visual Studio development system. Canadian-American software developer Tyler Menezes credits the slot machine program in Microsoft Visual Basic 6.0 Professional Step by Step (1998) for introducing him to game programming and coding initiatives. Ten editions of Visual Basic Step by Step were published between 1995 and 2013.

In 2020, Halvorson published Code Nation: Personal Computing and the Learn to Program Movement in America (ACM Books / Morgan & Claypool), a history of computing that emphasizes the influence of computer literacy debates in America and the range of experiences that hobbyist and professional developers had when creating software for early microcomputers, IBM PCs and compatibles, the Apple Macintosh, and Unix systems. An ethical component of Halvorson's work is his call to increase equity and access to programming instruction so that more may benefit from the opportunities afforded by digital electronic computing.

Academic influence 
Since 2003, Halvorson has been a professor of History at Pacific Lutheran University.

In 2009, he was appointed a research fellow at the Herzog August Bibliothek in Wolfenbüttel, Germany. His work there resulted in the European history monograph Heinrich Heshusius and Confessional Polemic in Early Lutheran Orthodoxy (Ashgate, 2010), a history of ecclesiastical networks and the religious and political intrigues of late Reformation Germany. His textbook, The Renaissance: All That Matters (2014), narrates the patterns and achievements of the Renaissance movement in Europe, opening at a graduation ceremony in Cambridge, England. He has also published articles in Sixteenth Century Journal, Archive for Reformation History, and Lutheran Quarterly, the later a publication of Johns Hopkins University Press.

In 2016, Halvorson was appointed Benson Family Chair of Business and Economic History at PLU. In 2018, he co-founded an Innovation Studies program that exposes students to influential ideas about design thinking, ethical leadership, and the history of technology.

Selected books 

 Michael J. Halvorson, Code Nation: Personal Computing and the Learn to Program Movement in America (ACM Books / Morgan & Claypool, 2020).
 Michael Halvorson, The Renaissance: All That Matters (London: Hodder and Stoughton / New York: McGraw-Hill, 2014).
 Michael Halvorson, Microsoft Visual Basic 2013 Step by Step (Sebastopol, CA: O'Reilly Media, 2013).
 Michael J. Halvorson, Heinrich Heshusius and Confessional Polemic in Early Lutheran Orthodoxy (St. Andrews Studies in Reformation History, Ashgate Publishing, England, 2010).
 Michael J. Halvorson and Karen E. Spierling, eds., Defining Community in Early Modern Europe (St. Andrews Studies in Reformation History, Ashgate Publishing, England, 2008).
 Robert P. Ericksen and Michael J. Halvorson, eds., A Lutheran Vocation: Philip A. Nordquist and the Study of History at Pacific Lutheran University (Tacoma, WA: Pacific Lutheran University Press, 2005).
Michael Halvorson, Microsoft Works 2000: Illustrated Complete, Course Technology Inc. (Cambridge, MA, 2000).
Michael Halvorson, Microsoft Office 2000: Illustrated Brief, Professional ed., Course Technology Inc. (Cambridge, MA, 2000).
 Michael Halvorson and Michael Young, Running Microsoft Office 2000 Professional, Microsoft Press (Redmond, WA, 1999).
 Michael Halvorson, Microsoft Visual Basic 6.0 Professional Step by Step, Microsoft Press (Redmond, WA, 1998).
Michael Halvorson, Microsoft Office 97 Professional Edition, Brief Edition, Course Technology Inc. (Cambridge, MA, 1998).
Michael Halvorson and Michael Young, Running Microsoft Office 97, Microsoft Press (Redmond, WA, 1997).
 Michael Halvorson and Michael Young, Running Microsoft Office for Windows 95, Microsoft Press (Redmond, WA, 1996).
Michael Halvorson, Microsoft Works 4 for Windows 95 Illustrated, Course Technology Inc. (Cambridge, MA, 1996).
 Michael Halvorson, Microsoft Visual Basic 4 Step by Step, Microsoft Press (Redmond, WA, 1995).
 Michael Halvorson and David Rygmyr, Running MS-DOS QBasic, Microsoft Press (Redmond, WA, 1991).
 Michael Halvorson and David Rygmyr, Learn BASIC for the Apple Macintosh Now, Microsoft Press (Redmond, WA, 1990).
 Michael Halvorson, JoAnne Woodcock, and Robert Ackerman, Running UNIX, Microsoft Press (Redmond, WA, 1990).
 Michael Halvorson and David Rygmyr, Learn BASIC Now, Microsoft Press (Redmond, WA, 1989).

References 

Living people
Microsoft employees
Pacific Lutheran University alumni
American computer programmers
University of Washington alumni
Technical writers
1963 births